Speen is a village in the Chiltern Hills, an Area of Outstanding Natural Beauty, situated in the civil parish of Lacey Green, in Buckinghamshire, England.

The village is a short distance 'as the crow flies' from Hampden House, originally owned by John Hampden and a further distance from Chequers, the country residence of the Prime Minister.

The village has an annual fete which is usually held on the first weekend of July and a bi-annual arts festival which has been running for many years. The festival consists of entertainment shows, a theatre production and general activities on Speen Playing Field.

History 

The village name originates from Anglo Saxon.  The exact meaning is unclear, but possibly meaning 'wood-chip place'. The name of the village corresponds to the location of the hamlet in the Chiltern Forest where trees were regularly felled.

The Baptist church was built by men of the village in 1802. The flints were apparently collected in their aprons by local women from surrounding fields, helped by their children. It is a Grade II listed building.

Surrounding Lands and Population 
The village is the style of a traditional 18th century, still consisting a mixture of woodland and agricultural fields surrounding the village. Due to the geographical location of the village no railway station was built. There are approximately 165 houses in the village which has a population at the time of the 2011 census of 637 and has an estimated population of 654 in 2019.

Speen Festival 
The village has a bi-annual culture and arts festival. The festival runs in September in odd numbered year and the 2017 festival ran from Saturday 2 September 2017 to Sunday 17 September 2017.

The first Speen Festival in 2001 was based on a festival (The Leaves of Time) held in 1999 to celebrate the passing of the Millennium.

Notable residents 
 In 1928 the artist Eric Gill moved to Pigotts at Speen, where he set up a printing press, and lettering workshop and alternative community. He is buried in the Baptist churchyard.
 The composer Edmund Rubbra lived at Valley Cottage, Highwood Bottom, Speen, for many years following his marriage in 1933.

References

External links

Speen history and local walks
The Speen Village Website
Speen Festival
https://www.visitsoutheastengland.com/places-to-visit/speen-p92311 

Villages in Buckinghamshire
Wycombe District